North Dakota Highway 40 (ND 40) is a north–south highway located in northwestern North Dakota. The  route traverses an area from US Highway 2 (US 2) near Tioga, in eastern Williams County, to the Canadian border where it continues as Saskatchewan Highway 47 (Hwy 47) in northern Divide County.

Route description 

ND 40 begins at a junction with US 2 south of Tioga, in eastern Williams County. It passes through that town and then begins a brief concurrency with ND 50 in McGregor.

ND 40 and ND 50 together enter Burke County. ND 40 leaves the concurrency in Battleview by turning northward to ND 5 in Columbus, and then turns west to run concurrently with that highway.

While in Noonan, it crosses an alignment of railroad tracks before continuing north. About  later, ND 40 ends at the Canadian border. The road continues beyond the port of entry and the Noonan-Estevan Highway Border Crossing as Hwy 47 on its way to Estevan, Saskatchewan.

Major intersections

See also 
List of Canada-United States border crossings

References

External links

North Dakota Highways Page by Chris Geelhart
NDDOT’s Highway Systems Page

040 
040 
040 
040